Atlas Mara Bank Zambia Limited (AMBZL), commonly referred to as Atlas Mara Bank Zambia, is a commercial bank in Zambia. It is licensed by the Bank of Zambia, the central bank and national banking regulator. AMBZL was established on 1 December 2016, when BancABC Zambia Limited merged with Finance Bank Zambia Limited.

Location
The headquarters of the bank and its main branch, are located in Atlas Mara House, at the corner of Church Road and Nasser Road, in the city of Lusaka, the capital and largest city of Zambia. The coordinates of the bank's headquarters are: 15°25'08.0"S, 28°18'02.0"E (Latitude:-15.418889; Longitude:28.300556).

Overview
Atlas Mara Bank is a large retail bank serving individuals, small and medium sized enterprises, large corporations and government departments across Zambia. , the bank controlled US$616 million in assets. At that time its branch network totaled 65 full branches, 24 agencies and 177 automated teller machines. Then, it was  the fifth largest bank in Zambia by asset value.

History
BancABC Zambia Limited was established in the early 2000s, as part of the BancABC conglomerate. In August 2015, Atlas Mara acquired 100 percent shareholding in BancABC.

Finance Bank Zambia Limited was established in 1986, having acquired a banking license from the Bank of Zambia. Its registered offices and main branch were located in Ndola, Zambia.

In November 2015 Atlas Mara, the parent of ABCBanc Zambia Limited, declared their intentions to acquire 100 percent shareholding in Finance Bank Zambia via stock and cash. The acquisition required regulatory approval.

On 1 July 2016, Atlas Mara completed the acquisition of FBZ Limited, for US$61 million in cash, 3.3 million shares of Atlas Mara stock and a deferred contingent consideration of up to 1.3 million shares. Atlas Mara announced that they planned to merge both FBZ Limited, which they had just acquired, with BancABC Zambia, which they already owned.

The merger of the two banks was effected on 1 December 2016, by the integration of their banking platforms into one operating system. The new entity adopted its current name, to reflect the new ownership.

Ownership
, the stock of the bank was 100 percent owned by Atlas Mara, a financial services conglomerate, with  headquarters in Tortola, British Virgin Islands, and whose shares are traded on the London Stock Exchange.

Branch Network
, Atlas Mara Bank Zambia, maintained a main office and a network of 65 stand-alone branches and 24 agencies, in all major metropolitan areas of Zambia.

See also
 List of banks in Zambia
 Bank of Zambia
 Economy of Zambia

References

External links
Website of Atlas Mara Bank Zambia Limited
Website of the Bank of Zambia
Bob Diamond's Misadventures in Africa

Banks of Zambia
Companies based in Lusaka
Banks established in 2016
2016 establishments in Zambia